Robert Woolley may refer to:

 Robert W. Woolley (1871–1958), American Democratic politician from Washington D.C
 J. Robert Wooley, Louisiana politician